Temnocephalidae is a family of flatworms belonging to the order Rhabdocoela.

Genera

Genera:
 Achenella Cannon, 1993
 Astacobdella Diesing, 1850
 Branchobdella Moquin-Tandon, 1846

References

Platyhelminthes